Mihai Daniel Lixandru (born 5 June 2001) is a Romanian professional footballer who plays as a defensive midfielder for Liga I club CS Mioveni, on loan from FCSB.

Career statistics

Club

References

External links
 
 

2001 births
Living people
Footballers from Bucharest
Romanian footballers
Romania under-21 international footballers
Association football midfielders
Liga I players
Liga II players
FC Steaua București players
ACS Viitorul Târgu Jiu players
CS Gaz Metan Mediaș players
CS Mioveni players